Humberto Gatica is a Chilean-born American recording engineer, mixing engineer and record producer, best known for his work with Celine Dion, Chicago, Michael Jackson, Barbra Streisand, Andrea Bocelli, Josh Groban and Michael Bublé. Gatica's international collaborations include producing artists singing in over six languages.

Gatica's career is highlighted by humanitarian projects including We Are the World, We Are The World 25 for Haiti, Hands Across America and Voces Unidas Por Chile. He has received 17 Grammy Awards and 24 nominations.

Early life and career
Gatica was born in Rancagua, Chile in a musical family. His grandparents owned a bar in Rancagua where they played the piano and the harp. His uncles Arturo, Orlando, María and Lucho Gatica were singers. Lucho Gatica is widely known in Latin America as the “King of Bolero”.

At age 9, Gatica's father died of an illness and his mother had to travel to the United States to look for employment. He moved in with his grandmother. Passionate about music, he taught himself to play the guitar at age 13. He describes that he particularly liked how the bathroom at his grandmother's house resonated when he played the guitar.

At age 16, after the death of his grandmother, Gatica decided to leave Chile. His Aunt Yolanda gave him the equivalent of 20 dollars. He gathered enough money to fly to Mexico City and then took a bus to Los Angeles. He reunited with his mother and younger brother and started working at a warehouse during the day and in a parking lot at night.

Four years later, in 1972, while Lucho Gatica was in Los Angeles, he called his nephew Humberto asking him to meet at the Beverly Hilton Hotel. Lucho Gatica asked Humberto to take him to MGM Recording Studio. Two months later, Humberto was invited to a recording session with Sammy Davis Jr., an artist he used to listen to with his grandmother in Rancagua. Gatica describes this experience:

Gatica gradually became an assistant engineer at MGM. In 1973, the recording engineer for a session with producer Don Costa was ill. Too late to cancel the session, Costa decided to “take his chances with the kid” and gave Gatica the opportunity of engineering the big band session with 40 people. He continued engineering for Costa afterwards.

When MGM Recording Studio was sold a year later, Gatica was laid off. He became a freelance engineer and started working with producers David Foster and Quincy Jones alongside engineer Bruce Swedien. Gatica was once spotted at Sunset Sound studios in Hollywood engineering three sessions at the same time for Kenny Rogers, Kenny Loggins and Chicago.

In 1974, Gatica engineered the album “Elis & Tom” by Antônio Carlos Jobim and Elis Regina. His work with Brazilian artists also includes Djavan's “A Voz, O Violão, A Música de Djavan” and “Lilas” albums, Paulinho Da Costa's “Agora”, Gilberto Gil's “Realce” and “Luar (A Gente Precisa Ver o Luar)” and Simone's “La Distancia”.

Gatica started collaborating with producer David Foster in the late 70s. Spanning over 25 years, they produced multi-platinum albums and singles including Chicago's Chicago 17 album, Celine Dion's “My Heart Will Go On”, Josh Groban's “Noël”, Michael Bublé's “Crazy Love” and Andrea Bocelli's “The Prayer”.
Foster describes his workflow with Gatica in an interview from 1984:

Gatica shares his point of view:

In 1985, he won his first Grammy Award for Best Engineered Recording – Non Classical for Chicago's album 17. He was the recording engineer for Michael Jackson's albums Thriller and Bad. Gatica won his second Grammy Award for Bad, also in the category of Best Engineered Recording – Non Classical.

In 2013, Gatica, along with KC Porter, produced Lucho Gatica's “Historia de un Amor”. It was the last album that Lucho Gatica recorded. Gatica commissioned Jorge Calandrelli with the arrangements. Together, they chose the guest performer for each song. The album consists of duets performing Latin-American standards and features artists Laura Pausini, Nelly Furtado, Il Volo, Michael Bublé, Lucero, Luis Fonsi, Miguel Bosé, among others.

In recent years, Gatica has focused on producing projects that highlight vocal performance. Gatica describes these as “artists who perform melodies that really make you feel”. Gatica was a judge at the Viña del Mar International Song Festival in 2000, 2005 and 2019.

In 2019, Gatica, along with Frédéric Gassita, produced Nigerian singer Timi Dakolo's “Merry Christmas Darling”. The album featured Emeli Sandé, Kenny G, Eric Benét and The Eben Voices of Gabon Choir. Co-executively produced by Ali Bongo Ondimba and Efe Ogbeni, the album was recorded at Abbey Road Studios in London, Capitol Studios in Los Angeles and additional studios in Libreville, Budapest and Lagos.

During the ongoing coronavirus pandemic, Gatica has worked on Groban's upcoming album “Harmony”, set to be released in November 2020. The album includes standards like “The First Time Ever I Saw Your Face” and “She”. Groban describes the album as evoking “a feeling of hope, a feeling of togetherness”.

Humanitarian collaborations 

Gatica's work as producer and engineer on humanitarian projects includes “We Are The World”, “We Are The World 25 for Haiti”, “Hands Across America”, “Hermanos”, “Voices That Care” and “Voces Unidas Por Chile”.

Gatica recorded the supergroup USA for Africa for “We Are The World”, produced by Quincy Jones and Michael Omartian. It sold over 7 million records worldwide and raised 60 million dollars, destined to feed people affected by the famine in Ethiopia from 1983 to 1985.

Gatica recorded “Voices That Care”, featuring artists including Meryl Streep, Kevin Costner, Garth Brooks, Julio Iglesias and The Beach Boys, produced by David Foster. The song was meant as an apolitical anthem to boost the morale of military personnel deployed during the Gulf crisis of 1991 and offer their families emotional support.

A 25th anniversary re-recording of “We Are The World” was being planned when a magnitude 7.0 earthquake devastated Haiti. The aim of the project shifted to fundraising efforts to assist the survivors. “We Are The World 25 for Haiti”, also produced by Quincy Jones, was recorded by Gatica featuring over 50 artists including Tony Bennett, Justin Bieber, T-Pain, Will.I.Am and Wyclef Jean. It debuted during the Winter Olympics in Vancouver.

The same year, on February 27, a magnitude 8.8 earthquake struck Gatica's native Chile. Supported by the National Council for Culture and Arts (Consejo nacional de la Cultura y las Artes, CNCA), Gatica produced the song “Gracias a la Vida” (Thanks To Life), recorded by supergroup “Voces Unidas por Chile” (United Voices for Chile). Featured artists included Beto Cuevas, Juanes, Alejandro Sanz, Juan Luis Guerra, Laura Pausini, Fher, Shakira, Michael Bublé and Miguel Bosé. The song was released digitally in a fundraising effort for the survivors. Besides fundraising, Gatica's goal was to leave a legacy for the Chilean youth and inspire others to help through the arts.

In 2018, Gatica produced Brazilian singer Greice Santo's single “Você Você” which speaks against sexual harassment. She wrote the song inspired by women in the #MeToo movement.

Style 
Gatica explains that his focus when producing is arrangement and performance:

In an interview in 1981, Gatica explains his role as an engineer when working with another producer. After analyzing a few instructions given by the producer, Gatica understands what his creative goal is. He makes sure the producer is pleased but he also goes beyond the technical role.

Gatica describes his mixes in a visual way. When mixing his first record for Michael Jackson, Jackson said to Gatica: “great, you work in colors”. “It’s my life”, Gatica replied. He describes the instruments in a mix in terms of a three-dimensional space:

Gatica points out that he is often concerned about clarity in his records.[3] When mixing, he starts with the lead vocal:

He lists the kick drum, the snare drum and the bass as the foundation of a mix. According to Gatica, these elements are responsible for the first impression on the listener.

When recording brass instruments, Gatica places the players in a “U” shape instead of having them stand side by side, as they normally do when playing live. He then positions individual microphones for the saxophones and trombones, as well as a single microphone for each of the trumpets. An additional microphone hung about 9 feet high the middle captures all the horns and adds “fullness the sound” according to Gatica. He used this same setup when recording brass with Chicago's 16. Because the band's brass section consists of only one trumpet, one saxophone and a trombone, four microphones were used in total: one for each instrument plus the additional microphone in the center.

Gatica works with a hybrid system combining digital recording and analog signal processing. He points out that he prefers analog processors especially when working with artists like Celine Dion, Andrea Bocelli, Josh Groban and Michael Bublé.

Awards 
Gatica has won 17 Grammy and Latin Grammy Awards. In 2007, Humberto Gatica was with his uncle Lucho Gatica on stage when the latter received the Lifetime Achievement Award at the 8th Latin Grammys. 8 years later, at the 16th Latin Grammys, Humberto Gatica received the Trustees Award. The award was presented by Celine Dion and Neil Portnow. On stage, Dion described Gatica's work with her starting at her first recording session in English:

Grammy Awards

Latin Grammy Awards

Discography 

1968: Newport Years, Oscar Peterson (Mastering Engineer) 
1974: Elis & Tom, Antonio Carlos Jobin & Elis Regina (Engineer) 
1975: Make The World Go Away, Donny & Marie Osmond (Engineer) 
1978: From the Inside, Alice Cooper (Engineer) 
1981: Ella Abraca Jobim, Ella Fitzgerald (Engineer) 
1982: Chicago 16, Chicago (Engineer, Mixing) 
1982: Janet Jackson, Janet Jackson (Mixing)
1982: Thriller, Michael Jackson (Engineer) 
1983: Can’t Slow Down, Lionel Richie (Engineer, Mixing) 
1984: 1100 Bel Air Place, Julio Iglesias (Engineer, Mixing)
1984: Chicago 17, Chicago (Engineer, Mixing) 
1984: Footloose Original Soundtrack (Remixing, Mixing)
1984: Private Dancer, Tina Turner (Remixing) 
1984: What About Me?, Kenny Rogers (Engineer, Mixing) 
1985: The Broadway Album, Barbra Streisand (Engineer, Remixing) 
1985: The Color Purple Original Motion Picture Soundtrack (Engineer)
1985: Eaten Alive, Diana Ross (Mixing) 
1985: Encontros e Despedidas, Milton Nascimento (Mixing) 
1986: Very Best of Michael McDonald, Michael McDonald (Remixing) 
1987: Bad, Michael Jackson (Drums, Engineer) 
1987: Richard Marx, Richard Marx (Producer, Engineer, Mixing) 
1990: Go West Young Man, Michael W. Smith (Mixing) 
1990: Unison, Celine Dion (Engineer, Mixing) 
1992: Myriam Hernandez, Myriam Hernandez (Mixing) 
1993: Aries, Luis Miguel (Mixing)
1993: Back to Broadway, Barbra Streisand (Engineer, Mixing)
1993: Colour of My Love, Celine Dion (Engineer)
1993: My World, Ray Charles (Mixing) 
1993: Send Me A Lover, Taylor Dayne (Producer, Engineer, Mixing)
1993: Touch of Music in the Night, Michael Crawford (Engineer)
1994: Crazy, Julio Iglesias (Engineer, Mixing) 
1994: Miracles: The Holiday Album, Kenny G (Engineer) 
1995: Carretera, Julio Iglesias (Engineer)
1995: Don’t Bore Us, Get to the Chorus: Greatest Hits, Roxette (Mixing) 
1995: The French Album, Celine Dion (Mixing) 
1995: Invisible, La Ley (Producer, Engineer, Mixing) 
1996: Day, Babyface (Engineer, String Engineer) 
1996: Dove C’e Musica, Eros Ramazzotti (Mixing) 
1996: Epiphany: The Best of Chaka Khan Vol. 1, Chaka Khan (Producer) 
1996: Falling Into You, Celine Dion (Producer, Engineer, Mixing) 
1996: The Mirror Has Two Faces, Marvin Hamlisch (Engineer) 
1996: Moment, Kenny G (Engineer) 
1996: Star Bright, Vanessa Williams (Engineer, Mixing) 
1996: Tango, Julio Iglesias (Engineer, String Engineer) 
1997: Higher Ground, Barbra Streisand (Engineer, Mixing) 
1997: Innamorato, Riccardo Cocciante (Mixing, Recording Technician) 
1997: Let’s Talk About Love, Celine Dion (Producer, Engineer, Mixing) 
1997: Still Waters, Bee Gees (Engineer) 
1998: Bathhouse Betty, Bette Midler (Engineer) 
1998: Because You Loved Me: Songs of Diane Warren, Johnny Mathis (Producer, Engineer, Mixing) 
1998: Believe, Cher (Mixing) 
1998: Body of Work, Paul Anka (Producer) 
1998: The Boy is Mine, Monica (Engineer) 
1998: Greatest Hits, Steve Perry (Engineer) 
1998: Jade, Corey Hart (Mixing) 
1998: Love Will Always Win, Faith Hill (Mixing) 
1998: My Love Is Your Love, Whitney Houston (Engineer) 
1998: R., R Kelly (Engineer) 1998: Vuelve, Ricky Martin (Mixing) 
1999: 25th Anniversary Edition, KC & The Sunshine Band (Mixing)
1999: Inolvidable, Vol. 2: Enamorado de Ti, Jose L. Rodriguez & Los Panchos (Mixing) 
1999: Rainbow, Mariah Carey (Mixing) 
1999: Sogno, Andrea Bocelli (Engineer, Mixing) 
2000: Love Songs, Deniece Williams (Engineer, Mixing) 
2000: Seul, Garou (Engineer, Mixing) 
2000: Uno, La Ley (Producer, Engineer, Mixing)
2001: Greatest Hits: HIStory, Vol. 1, Michael Jackson (Engineer) 
2001: Invincible, Michael Jackson (Engineer, Mixing) 
2001: Josh Groban, Josh Groban (Producer, Engineer, Mixing) 
2001: Loves Makes the World, Carole King (Producer, Engineer, Mixing) 
2001: MTV Unplugged, Alejandro Sanz (Arranger, Producer, Engineer, Mixing) 
2001: Q: The Musical Biography of Quincy Jones, Quincy Jones (Engineer) 
2001: Taberna del Buda, Café Quijano (Arranger, Producer, Engineer) 
2001: Yo por Ti, Olga Tañón (Producer, Mixing) 
2002: Mended, Marc Anthony (String Engineer) 
2002: Moulin Rouge Original Soundtrack (Mixing) 
2002: A New Day Has Come, Celine Dion (Arranger, Producer, Engineer, Mixing) 
2002: Paradise, Kenny G (Engineer, Mixing) 
2002: Prelude: The Best of Charlotte Church, Charlotte Church (Engineer) 
2002: Quizás, Enrique Iglesias (Mixing) 
2002: Sobrevivir, Olga Tañón (Producer, Engineer, Mixing) 
2002: Twisted Angel, LeAnn Rimes (Engineer) 
2003: The Best of Me, David Foster (Producer, Engineer, Mixing) 
2003: Closer, Josh Groban (Engineer, Mixing) 
2003: Let It Snow, Michael Bublé (Engineer, Mixing) 
2003: Libertad, La Ley (Arranger, Producer, Engineer) 
2004: Come Fly With Me, Michael Bublé (Producer, Engineer, Mixing) 
2004: En La Luna, Reyli (Mixing) 
2004: Live At The Greek, Josh Groban (Producer, Engineer, Mixing) 
2004: Renee Olstead, Renee Olstead (Producer, Engineer, Mixing) 
2005: #1’s, Destiny’s Child (Producer, Engineer, Mixing) 
2005: Ancora, Il Divo (Vocal Engineer) 
2005: Caught In The Act, Michael Bublé (Producer, Engineer, Mixing) 
2005: Home, Michael Bublé (Producer, Engineer, Mixing) 
2005: It’s Time, Michael Bublé (Producer, Engineer, Mixing) 
2006: Amor, Andrea Bocelli (Arranger, Producer, Engineer) 
2006: Awake, Josh Groban (Producer, Engineer, Mixing) 
2006: Duets: An American Classic, Tony Bennett (Vocal Mixing) 
2006: Under the Desert Sky, Andrea Bocelli (Producer, Mixing) 
2006: Vittorio, Vittorio Grigolo (Mixing) 
2007: Best of Andrea Bocceli: Vivere, Andrea Bocelli (Producer, Engineer) 
2007: Christmas Wish, Olivia Newton-John (Engineer) 
2007: D’Elles, Celine Dion (Engineer, Mixing) 
2007: Noel, Josh Groban (Engineer, Mixing) 
2007: Taking Chances, Celine Dion (Engineer) 
2008: Brasileiro, Antonio Carlos Jobim (Technician) 
2008: David Cavazos, David Cavazos (Producer, Mixing) 
2008: Rhythm and Romance, Kenny G (Engineer, Mixing) 
2008: Vivere: Live in Tuscany, Andrea Bocelli (Producer, Engineer, Mixing) 
2009: Michael Bublé Meets Madison Square Garden, Michael Bublé (Producer, Mixing)
2009: Patrizio, Patrizio Buanne (Producer, Engineer, Mixing, Rhythm Arrangements)
2015: El Amor, Gloria Trevi (Producer)
2015: Cinema, Andrea Bocelli (Producer)
2016: Amor Absoluto: Medley Tributo a Julio Iglesias, Edward Mena (Producer)
2017: The Journey, Thomas Spencer (Producer)

References

1951 births
Living people
People from Rancagua
American audio engineers
Grammy Award winners
Latin Grammy Award winners
American record producers
Chilean people of Basque descent
Chilean record producers
Chilean emigrants to the United States
Latin music record producers